Mike McPhail is an American author, editor, and game designer as well as publisher of fiction, and is best known for his work in military fiction.

McPhail has spoken at industry and pop culture conventions, and has appeared as a guest speaker and panelist at Balticon, Confluence, Heliosphere, LunaCon, DerpyCon, DexCon, Far Point, Shikkaricon, and Shore Leave.

He is a member of the Military Writers Society of America (MWSA), and the creator of the Alliance Archives (All'Arc) series and its related Martial Role-Playing Game (MRPG)

McPhail and his wife Danielle Ackley-McPhail are founders and owners of ESpec Books. a small press publisher.

So It Begins was a finalist for Best Anthology at the 2009 Indie Book Awards.

Personal life 

McPhail attended the Academy of Aeronautics in New York (now the Vaughn College of Aeronautics and Technology) and served in the Air National Guard.

Bibliography

Short fiction

Defending the Future Series 

 Breach the Hull (2007) by Dark Quest 
 So It Begins (2009) 
 By Other Means (2011) 
 No Man's Land (2011) 
 Best Laid Plans (2013) 
 Dogs of War (2013) 
 Man and Machine (2016) 
 In Harm's Way (In Production)
 The Best of Defending the Future

Beyond the Cradle Series 

 If We Had Known (Beyond the Cradle Book 1) (2017) by eSpec Books

Other Anthologies 
 Jaelle Her Book 
 Cowboys in Space: Tales of Byanntia
 The Die Is Cast 
 Fallen City 
 Barbarians at the Jumpgate 
 The Stories in Between: A Between Books Anthology

References 

Living people
20th-century American novelists
21st-century American novelists
Writers from New York City
1962 births